= HEC-Chad University =

Higher institution of learning in Chad

Coordinates: 12.1283°N 15.0900°E

- Type: Private
- Established: December 9, 2016
- Location: Chad

HEC-Chad University is located in N'Djamena, Chad. The HEC-Chad Institute was created in 2003 and became a university by Decree No. 453/PR/PM/MESRI/SEESRI/SG/DGRESRS/DESP/2016 on December 9, 2016. It is a member of REDIPES, an observer of CAMES, and is sponsored by the University of N'Djamena and several African and French institutions.

== Location ==
It is located in the 8th arrondissement of the capital, N'Djamena.

== Notes and references ==
- Tchad: HEC-Tchad, première des universités privées
- Tchad: L'université HEC-Tchad désormais partenaire de l'université Henry Durant
